In computability theory Post's theorem, named after Emil Post, describes the connection between the arithmetical hierarchy and the Turing degrees.

Background 

The statement of Post's theorem uses several concepts relating to definability and recursion theory.  This section gives a brief overview of these concepts, which are covered in depth in their respective articles. 

The arithmetical hierarchy classifies certain sets of natural numbers that are definable in the language of Peano arithmetic.   A formula  is said to be  if it is an existential statement in prenex normal form (all quantifiers at the front) with  alternations between existential and universal quantifiers applied to a formula with bounded quantifiers only.  Formally a formula  in the language of Peano arithmetic is a  formula if it is of the form

where  contains only bounded quantifiers and Q is  if m is even and  if m is odd.

A set of natural numbers  is said to be  if it is definable by a  formula, that is, if there is a  formula  such that each number  is in  if and only if  holds. Thus the number of quantifier alternations required to define a set gives a measure of the complexity of the set.

Post's theorem uses the relativized arithmetical hierarchy as well as the unrelativized hierarchy just defined.

While the arithmetical hierarchy measures definability of sets of natural numbers, Turing degrees measure the level of uncomputability of sets of natural numbers.
Given a set , the Turing jump  is the set of indices  of oracle Turing machines that halt on input  when run with oracle . It is known that every set  is Turing reducible to its Turing jump, but the Turing jump of a set is never Turing reducible to the original set.  

Post's theorem uses finitely iterated Turing jumps.

Post's theorem and corollaries 

Post's theorem establishes a close connection between the arithmetical hierarchy and the Turing degrees of the form , that is, finitely iterated Turing jumps of the empty set.  (The empty set could be replaced with any other computable set without changing the truth of the theorem.)

Post's theorem states:
The set  is -complete for every .

Post's theorem has many corollaries that expose additional relationships between the arithmetical
hierarchy and the Turing degrees.  These include:
Fix a set . This is the relativization of the first part of Post's theorem to the oracle .
A set  is  if and only if . More generally,  is  if and only if .

Proof of Post's theorem

Formalization of Turing machines in first-order arithmetic
The operation of a Turing machine  on input  can be formalized logically in first-order arithmetic. The machine halts if and only if there is a number  such that  is the halting state.

The exact relation depends on the specific implementation of the notion of Turing machine (e.g. their alphabet, allowed mode of motion along the tape, etc.)

Thus there is a formula  in first-order arithmetic with no unbounded quantifiers, such that  halts on input  at time  at most if and only if  is satisfied.

Implementation example
For example, for a prefix-free Turing machine with binary alphabet and no blank symbol, we may use the following notations:
 is the 1-ary symbol for the configuration of the whole tape after  steps (which we may write as a number with LSB first, the value of the m-th location on the tape being its m-th least significant bit). In particular  is the initial configuration of the tape, which corresponds the input to the machine.
 is the 1-ary symbol for the Turing machine state after  steps. In particular, the initial state of the Turing machine.
 is the 1-ary symbol for the Turing machine location on the tape after  steps. In particular .
  is the transition function of the Turing machine, written as a function from a doublet (machine state, bit read by the machine) to a triplet (new machine state, bit written by the machine, +1 or -1 machine movement along the tape).
 is the j-th bit of a number . This can be written as a first-order arithmetic formula with no unbounded quantifiers.

. Since M has a finite domain, this can be replaced by a first-order quantifier-free arithmetic formula. The exact formula obviously depends on M.
 
. Thus the universal quantifier over j can be bounded by +1, as bits beyond this location have no relevance for the machine's operation.

T halts on input  at time  at most if and only if  is satisfied, where:

Recursively enumerable sets
Let  be a set that can be recursively enumerated by a Turing machine.

This can be formalized by the first-order arithmetical formula presented above.

This Turing machine halts on precisely the set of natural numbers satisfying , and thus enumerates its corresponding set.

Oracle machines

Similarly, the operation of an oracle machine  with an oracle O that halts after at most  steps on input  can be described by a first-order formula , except that the formula  now includes:
 A new predicate, giving the oracle answer. This predicate must satisfy some formula to be discussed below.
 An additional tape - the oracle tape - on which  has to write the number m for every call O(m) to the oracle; writing on this tape can be logically formalized in a similar manner to writing on the machine's tape. Note that an oracle machine that halts after at most  steps has time to write at most  digits on the oracle tape. So the oracle can only be called with numbers m satisfying .

If the oracle is for a decision problem,  is always "Yes" or "No", which we may formalize as 0 or 1. Suppose the decision problem itself can be formalized by a first-order arithmetic formula .
Then  halts on  after at most  steps if and only if the following formula is satisfied:

where  is a first-order formula with no unbounded quantifiers.

Turing jump

If O is an oracle to the halting problem of a machine , then  is the same as "there exists  such that  starting with input m is at the halting state after  steps". 
Thus:

where  is a first-order formula that formalizes .

Since there is a finite number of numbers m satisfying , we may choose the same number of steps for all of them: there is a number , such that  halts after  steps precisely on those inputs  for which it halts at all.

Moving to prenex normal form, we get that the oracle machine halts on input  if and only if the following formula is satisfied:

(informally, there is a "maximal number of steps" such every oracle that does not halt within the first  steps does not stop at all; however, for every, each oracle that halts after  steps does halt).

Thus we may write:

We may thus enumerate the –tuples of natural numbers and run an oracle machine with an oracle for  that goes through all of them until it finds a satisfaction for the formula. This oracle machine halts on precisely the set of natural numbers satisfying , and thus enumerates its corresponding set.

Higher Turing jumps

We may thus enumerate the –tuples of natural numbers and run an oracle machine with an oracle for  that goes through all of them until it finds a satisfaction for the formula. This oracle machine halts on precisely the set of natural numbers satisfying , and thus enumerates its corresponding set.

References 

Rogers, H.   The Theory of Recursive Functions and Effective Computability, MIT Press. ;   

Soare, R. Recursively enumerable sets and degrees. Perspectives in Mathematical Logic.  Springer-Verlag, Berlin, 1987. 

Theorems in the foundations of mathematics
Computability theory
Mathematical logic hierarchies